The Frank Crane Arena is a 2,400-seat multi-purpose arena in Nanaimo, British Columbia.  It is home to the Nanaimo Clippers of the British Columbia Hockey League and the Nanaimo Timbermen of the Western Lacrosse Association.

References

Indoor arenas in British Columbia
Indoor ice hockey venues in Canada
Sports venues in British Columbia
British Columbia Hockey League arenas
Buildings and structures in Nanaimo
Sport in Nanaimo
Indoor lacrosse venues in Canada
Boxing venues in Canada